Water carrier (also water seller) is a profession that existed before the advent of centralized water supply systems. A water carrier collected water from a source (a river, a well, water pumps, etc.) and transported or carried containers with water to people's homes. After the construction of pipe networks, the profession of water carrier became unnecessary and disappeared.

In late Qing dynasty Chengdu,  there were over one thousand people who worked as water carriers. They not only performed their official duties, but also helped the elderly and sick who could not take care of themselves with housework. In the 1940s Chengdu water carriers still went barefoot to show that they go deep into the river to collect the purest water.

Between the 16th and 19th centuries in Ottoman Turkey, dervishes called saka or sebilci distributed water for charitable purposes. Among them were dervishes who sympathized with the Mevlevi order.

Gallery

See also
Aquarius (astrology)
Habibullah Kalakani, known as Son of the water carrier.
Les deux journées, an 1800 opera by Luigi Cherubini also known as The Water Carrier.

References 

 
 
 

Food services occupations
Obsolete occupations
Water